Perixestis is a genus of moths of the family Xyloryctidae.

Species
 Perixestis eucephala (Turner, 1902)
 Perixestis rhizophaga (Turner, 1902)

References

Xyloryctidae
Xyloryctidae genera